The Dumas method of molecular weight determination was historically a procedure used to determine the molecular weight of an unknown substance. The Dumas method is appropriate to determine the molecular weights of volatile organic substances that are liquids at room temperature.

The method was designed by the French chemist Jean Baptiste André Dumas, after whom the procedure is now named. Dumas  used the method to determine the vapour densities of elements (mercury, phosphorus, sulfur) and inorganic compounds.

Today, modern methods such as mass spectrometry and elemental analysis are used to determine the molecular weight of a substance.

Determination
The procedure entailed placing a small quantity of the unknown substance into a tared vessel of known volume. The vessel is then heated in a boiling water bath; all the air within the flask would be expelled, replaced by the vapor of the unknown substance. When no remaining liquid can be observed, the vessel may be sealed (e.g. with a flame), dried, and weighed.

By subtracting the tare of the vessel, the actual mass of the unknown vapor within the vessel can be calculated. Assuming the unknown compound obeyed the ideal gas equation, the number of moles of the unknown compound, n, can be determined by

where the pressure, p, is the atmospheric pressure, V is the measured volume of the vessel, T is the absolute temperature of the boiling water bath, and R is the ideal gas constant.

By dividing the mass in grams of the vapor within the vessel by the calculated number of moles, the molecular weight may be obtained.

Assumptions
Two major assumptions are used in this method:

 The compound vapor behaves ideally
 Either the volume of the vessel does not vary significantly between room and the working temperature, or the volume of the vessel may be accurately determined at the working temperature

See also
 Victor Meyer apparatus
 Cryoscopy and ebullioscopy, two other methods for the determination of molecular weights

References

Further reading

External links
 https://web.archive.org/web/20091229043650/http://chemlabs.uoregon.edu/Classes/Exton/CH228/Dumas.pdf
 https://web.archive.org/web/20100820010803/http://wwwchem.csustan.edu/chem1102/molwt.htm

Molecular physics